Kindersley is a surname. Notable people with the surname include:

Charles Kindersley (1893-1958), English cricketer
Gay Kindersley (1930-2011), British champion amateur jump jockey and horse trainer
Hugh Kindersley, 2nd Baron Kindersley
Jemima Kindersley (1749-1809), English travel writer
Nathaniel Edward Kindersley (1763–1831), translator of Tamil literature into English
Peter Kindersley (born 1941), co-founder of the publishing company Dorling Kindersley
Richard Kindersley, British typeface designer
Richard Torin Kindersley (1792–1879), English judge and Vice-Chancellor in the Court of Chancery
Robert Kindersley, 1st Baron Kindersley, British businessman, stockbroker, merchant banker